The Men's 50 metre freestyle S1 swimming event at the 2004 Summer Paralympics was competed on 24 September. It was won by Izhak Mamistvalov, representing .

Final round

24 Sept. 2004, evening session

References

M